Herford is a surname. Notable people with the surname include:

 Beatrice Herford (1868–1952), American actor
 C. H. Herford (1853–1931), English literary scholar
 Geoffrey Herford (1905–2000), British entomologist 
 Heinrich von Herford (c.1300–1370), Dominican friar and chronicler
 Henry Herford (born 1947), Scottish baritone
 Laura Herford (18313–1870), British painter
 Jay Herford (born 1987), American soccer player
 Oliver Herford (1863–1935), American writer
 R. Travers Herford (1860–1950), British Unitarian minister
 Siegfried Herford (1891–1916), British climber